Expo Real (written EXPO REAL) is the biggest trade fair for real estate and investment in Europe. Since 1998 it has been organized by Messe München GmbH in the grounds of Messe München every year. Expo Real is Europe's biggest B2B trade fair. 

In 2019 Expo Real covered an exhibition area of 72,250 square meters. There were 46,747 participants from 76 countries, including 24,682 representatives from 2,190 exhibiting companies.

Concept 
The exhibition zones of Expo Real reflect the complete supply chain of the real estate industry and extend from planning and project development to advisory activities and financing as well as implementation, operations and investment. The conference program does not only include topics related to real estate, but also addresses topical economic and political questions. The participants are offered an international networking platform. They have the opportunity to initiate business, present and initiate projects and make new contacts.

The participants of Expo Real come from all over the world, mainly from Europe. This is also reflected in the so-called national pavilions in which exhibitors with the same geographical background are clustered in a common exhibition area. At Expo Real 2019, representatives from new cities including Belfast, Porto and Copenhagen and countrywide representation from Malta and Lebanon attended for the first time. 

Joint stands focusing on important asset classes have also been established: for the logistics properties the “LogRealCampus”, for hotel properties the “World of Hospitality”. Apart from that, 2016 saw the first special networking area for retailers and their partners, the “Grand Plaza”. In 2019, the new NOVA3 hall, dedicated to exploring how innovative proptech can benefit the sector, was introduced. 

Under the title “Intelligent Urbanization” the topic of “sustainable urban planning and development” is discussed at Expo Real. Participants can obtain information in a separate exhibition area as well as from presentations and panel discussions of the supporting conference program.

The extensive international conference program with about 400 speakers provides a profound overview of the latest topics, trends and innovations in the industry. In 2019, there was a series of panels ranging from Brexit, coworking, to the state of proptech, the future of urban planning and climate-friendly development. Another major topic was affordable housing, where measures ranging from rent caps to increasing the density of development in urban areas were discussed.  

The “CareerDay” on the third day of the trade fair is particularly attractive for students. This is where young professionals and newcomers to the industry make contacts with company representatives and attend a specialized conference program. Participants of the CareerDay can use the complete range offered by Expo Real at reduced rates on all three days of the trade fair.

Number of participants 
46,747 participants from 76 countries (2018: 45,058/73) came to the 22nd International trade fair for real estate and investment in 2019 (plus 3.8 per cent compared to 2018). The total number of visitors consisted of 22,065 individual visitors (2018: 22,029) and 24,682 company representatives (2018: 23,029). The percentage of international visitors went up to 33 per cent in 2019 (2018: 31.5 per cent). Behind Germany the top ten visiting countries were: United Kingdom, Netherlands, Austria, Poland, Switzerland, France, Czech Republic, Luxembourg, the US and Spain.

The total of 2,190 exhibitors (a rise of 4.5 percent compared to 2,095 in 2018) came from 45 countries. Behind Germany the top ten exhibiting countries were: Austria, Netherlands, Switzerland, Poland, UK, France, Romania, US, Czech Republic and Luxembourg.

References 

EXPO REAL website
FKM statistics of shows from 2008 to 2010 at Auma
FKM statistics of Expo Real 2014 at Auma

Real estate in Germany
Trade fairs in Germany
Economy of Munich